Mellification can refer to:

The making or production of honey
The process of producing human mummy confection